Microlamia is a genus of longhorn beetles of the subfamily Lamiinae.

Species 
Microlamia contains the following species:

 Microlamia elongata Breuning, 1940
 Microlamia norfolkensis Breuning, 1947
 Microlamia pygmaea Bates, 1874
 Microlamia viridis Slipinski & Escalona, 2013

References

Dorcadiini